The Good, The Bad, The Sexy is the tenth studio album by American recording artist Joe. The album was released on October 18, 2011. "Gone Away", which leaked onto the internet in late July, was thought to be a track on the album, but according to Joe's Twitter on August 1, 2011 it is not.  Joe said, "The Neptunes song that hit the net today IS me, but we recorded that a loooong time ago. Years ago. It will not be on the new album" The album debuted at number eight on the US Billboard 200 and number two on the Hot R&B/Hip Hop albums chart.

Track listing

Charts

Weekly charts

Year-end charts

References

External links
[ The Good, the Bad, the Sexy] at Allmusic

2011 albums
Joe (singer) albums